Marcelo Tejera (born August 6, 1973) is a former Uruguayan footballer who played as an attacking midfielder.

Tejera made his debut for the Uruguay national team in a friendly match against Mexico (1–1 draw) on November 20, 1991 in Veracruz, substituting Gabriel Cedrés in the 75th minute.

References

External links

1973 births
Living people
Uruguayan footballers
Uruguay international footballers
Uruguay under-20 international footballers
Uruguay youth international footballers
Association football midfielders
Uruguayan expatriate footballers
Uruguayan Primera División players
Liga MX players
Serie A players
La Liga players
Segunda División players
Argentine Primera División players
Categoría Primera A players
Defensor Sporting players
Cagliari Calcio players
Boca Juniors footballers
CD Logroñés footballers
Peñarol players
Southampton F.C. players
Club Nacional de Football players
Tecos F.C. footballers
Millonarios F.C. players
Liverpool F.C. (Montevideo) players
Expatriate footballers in Italy
Expatriate footballers in Spain
Expatriate footballers in Argentina
Expatriate footballers in England
Expatriate footballers in Colombia
Expatriate footballers in Mexico